Asip Kholbihi (born 1 February 1966) is an Indonesian politician who is currently the regent of Pekalongan Regency, Central Java. He was elected in 2015 and sworn into office in 2016.

Biography
Asip Kholbihi was born in Banjarnegara on 1 February 1966. He had graduated from University of Pekalongan and later on getting a masters from Diponegoro University. Prior to becoming regent, he had served two terms in Pekalongan Regency Council as its speaker and was elected in 2014 to Central Java Provincial Council.

He participated in Pekalongan's 2015 local election with Ariani Antono, wife of the previous regent Amat Antono, as running mate. The couple won with 250,523 votes, and the Constitutional Court of Indonesia upheld their win following a lawsuit by their competitor. The pair was sworn in on 27 June 2016.

While regent, he visited Moscow to promote Pekalongan's batik crafts. During his term, the regency's government set up a 1,600-hectare industrial zone, centered on textiles. He also launched a program granting benefits to schoolchildren from low-income families.

References

1966 births
Living people
Mayors and regents of places in Central Java
People from Pekalongan
People from Banjarnegara Regency
Members of Indonesian regency councils
Central Java Provincial Council members
Regents of places in Indonesia